Harry Magnus Olaussen (born 8 October 1929 at Shanghai, China) was a New Democratic Party member of the House of Commons of Canada. He was a merchant seaman, stationary engineer and steam engineer by career.

He was first elected at the Coast Chilcotin riding in the 1972 general election. After serving one term, the 29th Canadian Parliament, he was defeated at Coast Chilcotin by Jack Pearsall of the Liberal party in the 1974 election. He also campaigned in the 1979 and 1980 federal elections at Cariboo—Chilcotin, but was defeated by Lorne Greenaway of the Progressive Conservative party.

External links
 

1929 births
Living people
Canadian expatriates in China
Members of the House of Commons of Canada from British Columbia
New Democratic Party MPs
Politicians from Shanghai